In the eighteenth century, it became the norm for the Archduke of Austria, who was lord of the Netherlands by inheritance, to appoint a diplomat with the rank of minister plenipotentiary to represent his interests at the court of the governor-general of the Netherlands in Brussels. The minister plenipotentiary served as an intermediary between the courts of Vienna and Brussels and as a check on the development of any independent policy in the latter. The post of governor was gradually reduced to a primarily ceremonial function—especially during the tenure of the first Cobenzl—and the minister plenipotentiary became the de facto supreme authority in the Netherlands.

1716 Lothar Joseph Dominik Graf von Königsegg-Rothenfels
1716–1724 Hercule-Louis Turinetti
1725 Wirich Philipp von Daun (ad interim)
1726–1732 Giulio Visconti Borromeo Arese
1732–1741 Friedrich August von Harrach-Rohrau
1743–1744 Karl Ferdinand von Königsegg-Erps
1744–1746 Wenzel Anton von Kaunitz-Rietberg
1748–1749 Károly Batthyány
1749–1753 Antoniotto Botta Adorno
1753–1770 Johann Karl Philipp von Cobenzl
1770–1783 Georg Adam von Starhemberg
1783–1787 Ludovico di Belgiojoso
1787 Joseph Jacob Murray (ad interim)
1787–1789 Ferdinand von Trauttmansdorff
1789–1790 Philipp von Cobenzl
1790–1791 Florimond de Mercy-Argenteau
1791–1794 Franz Georg Karl von Metternich

Notes

Sources

18th century in the Habsburg monarchy
Politicians of the Austrian Netherlands